The Škoda Vision 7S is an all-electric SUV, that is expected to feature Škoda's new Modern Solid design language, which is to be adopted by all its future production models.

Škoda initially showed the concept on 22 March 2022 with a blurry image of the exterior, and on 15 July 2022 with a sketch of the interior, previewed the interior on 16 August 2022, and once again the exterior on 23 August 2022.

Overview
Shortly after, the Czech manufacturer unveiled its new logo, a continuation of the brand's new design language unveiled with the concept.

References

External links

Vision 7S
Electric concept cars